The 2016–17 Qatari League, also known as Qatari Stars League, is the 44th edition of top level football championship in Qatar. The season began on 15 September 2016 and concluded on 27 April 2017. 

Al-Rayyan are the defending champions having won their eighth championship and Lekhwiya won the league title. Al-Muaither and Al-Shahania have entered as the two promoted teams from the 2015–16 Qatargas League and they both got relegated this season.

Teams

Stadia and locations

Managerial changes

League table

Statistics

Top scorers
As of 15 April 2017

Top assists

Clean sheets
As of 15 April 2017

References

External links
 

Qatar Stars League seasons
Qatar
2016–17 in Qatari football